The Kalyazin Bell Tower is a Neoclassical campanile rising to a height of  over the waters of the Uglich Reservoir on the Volga River opposite the old town of Kalyazin, in Tver Oblast, northwestern Russia.

History
The steepled belfry was built in 1796—1800 as part of the Monastery of St. Nicholas, with a pentacupolar katholikon dating from 1694. Of its 12 bells, the largest weighed some 1038 poods (17,000kg). It was cast in 1895 to commemorate the coronation of Nicholas II of Russia.

Submersion
When Joseph Stalin ordered the construction of the Uglich Dam in 1939 to form the Uglich Reservoir, the old parts of Kalyazin, including several medieval structures, were submerged under the reservoir's waters. This included the Saint Nicholas Monastery and Troitsky Makariev Monastery. 

The katholikon was dismantled, while the campanile was left, a landmark towering above the water.

Present day
The campanile became the main destination of tourist interest in eastern Tver Oblast. The structure's islet was shored up underneath, and has a small pier for boats. 

Orthodox Christians hold a Divine Service in the belfry several times a year.

See also
Mologa
Korcheva
List of tallest Orthodox churches

References

External links

Christian bell towers
Towers in Russia
Towers completed in 1800
Buildings and structures in Tver Oblast
Cultural heritage monuments of federal significance in Tver Oblast
Neoclassical church buildings in Russia